Toga language may refer to:
 Lo-Toga language, an Oceanic language of Vanuatu
 Gizrra language, a Papuan language of Papua New Guinea